Schöna is a station located on the grounds of Reinhardtsdorf-Schöna municipality, Saxony, Germany. It is the closest German station to the national border between Germany and the Czech Republic on the Děčín–Dresden-Neustadt railway. It is not a border station, though. Those used to be Bad Schandau and Děčín hlavní nádraží. There are a couple of sidings south of the station where the S1 can prepare to return towards Dresden.

There is hardly any access from the station to village of Schöna, which is outside the Elbe valley in southern direction. The station is more important to reach the village of Hřensko in the Czech Republic, which is just across the river and can be reached by ferry.

Train services
The following services currently call at the station:

Regional services  Dresden – Pirna – Bad Schandau – Děčín – Ústí nad Labem – Litoměřice (operates summer weekends)
Local services  Rumburk – Dolní Poustevna – Sebnitz – Bad Schandau – Děčín
Dresden S-Bahn  ''Meißen Triebischtal – Dresden – Heidenau – Pirna – Bad Schandau – Schöna

References

External links

Network map
Schöna station at www.verkehrsmittelvergleich.de 

Railway stations in Saxony
Railway stations in Germany opened in 1851
Reinhardtsdorf-Schöna
Dresden S-Bahn stations